Trastikovo is a village in Kameno Municipality, in Burgas Province, in southeastern Bulgaria.

References

External links
Website focusing on the village, news and events

Villages in Burgas Province